Hazari may refer to:
 something of, or related to, several of the entities referred to as "Hazara", particularly:
 the Hazaras, an ethnic group of Afghanistan
 Hazara, Pakistan, a region in northern Pakistan
Northern Hindko, also known as Hazari, an Indo-Aryan language of northern Pakistan
 Hazari (caste), a caste in the Indian state of Andhra Pradesh
 Hazari, an alien species appearing in the "Think Tank" episode of Star Trek
 Hezari, Chabahar, a village in Iran
 Hezari, Qasr-e Qand, a village in Iran

People named Hazari 
 Abdul Ghani Hazari (1921–1976), Bangladeshi poet and journalist
 Joynal Hazari, Bangladeshi politician
 Maheshwar Hazari (born 1971), Indian politician of Bihar
 Nizam Hazari, Bangladeshi politician
 Hazari Lal Chauhan, Indian politician from New Delhi
 Hazari Prasad Dwivedi (1907–1979), Hindi writer and scholar

See also 
 Hasari (disambiguation)
 Hazare, a surname